Salvador Johan Pérez Díaz (born May 10, 1990), nicknamed "Salvy", is a Venezuelan-American professional baseball catcher for the Kansas City Royals of Major League Baseball (MLB). He is a seven-time MLB All-Star, five-time Gold Glove Award winner, and received the World Series Most Valuable Player Award when the Royals won the 2015 World Series over the New York Mets.

Pérez currently holds the single-season Major League Baseball record for most home runs as a primary catcher with 48, surpassing Johnny Bench, who hit 45 during the 1970 season.

Early life
Pérez was born in Valencia, Carabobo, Venezuela. He was abandoned by his father at age four and raised by his mother, Yilda Díaz. When he was eight years old, the two relocated to Valencia to live with Yilda's mother, Carmen de Díaz. Yilda supported the family by selling homemade cakes, flan, and lasagna.

To keep her only child busy, Yilda enrolled him in a baseball school in Valencia, where he showed an ability to throw, catch, and hit balls as young as age six. He played pitcher and shortstop with teams competing in state and national tournaments. At age eight, he indicated his preference to play catcher, and, at 14, set his mind to playing that position professionally. Pérez played with and against current Major Leaguer and fellow Venezuelan second baseman José Altuve during his boyhood.

Professional career

Minor Leagues
Pérez was signed by the Royals for $65,000 when he was 16 years old. His minor league career began in 2007 when he was placed in the Arizona Complex League. In 2008 and 2009, Pérez played for the Burlington Royals and Idaho Falls Chukars. In 2010, Pérez was promoted to the High-A Wilmington Blue Rocks. In 2011, Pérez was promoted again, and played for the Double-A Northwest Arkansas Naturals and the Triple-A Omaha Storm Chasers.

Kansas City Royals

2011
Pérez was called up to the majors for the first time on August 10, 2011, and debuted against the Tampa Bay Rays at Tropicana Field. He picked off two baserunners, caught five popups – both uncommon occurrences for the Royals that season – recorded his first RBI in the 4th inning, and first hit in the 7th inning. On August 29, Pérez hit his first Major League home run against Max Scherzer of the Detroit Tigers. In that game, Pérez was a triple away from hitting for the cycle. In his rookie year, he batted .331/.361/.473 with 3 home runs and 21 runs driven in, in 39 games played.

2012
On February 27, 2012, Pérez signed a five-year, $7 million extension that included three club options and placed him under team control through 2019. His earning potential was up to $26.75 million if he reached all of his incentives and all of his options were picked up. The extension covered his pre-arbitration seasons, two of his three arbitration-eligible years, and, if all of his options are picked up, his final arbitration year and his first two years of free agency. Pérez earned $750,000 in 2012, $1 million in 2013, $1.5 million in 2014, $1.75 million in 2015 and $2 million in 2016. His options were $3.75 million in 2017, $5 million in 2018 and $6 million in 2019.

While catching a bullpen session before a spring training game in 2012, Pérez tore the meniscus in his left knee. He did not return until July 2. In the 2012 season, he hit .301/.328/.471 with 11 homers and 39 RBIs in 79 games played.

2013
On July 16, 2013, Pérez was the catcher for Mariano Rivera in Rivera's final All-Star Game before retirement. After the season, Pérez was awarded the American League Gold Glove Award for his defense at catcher. He finished the year playing 138 games with a .292/.323/.433 average, 13 home runs, and 79 RBI.

2014
In 2014, he logged more starts (143) than any other catcher in the Major Leagues. Pérez played in 150 games in 2014, batting .260/.289/.403 with 28 doubles, 17 home runs, and 70 RBI.

In the 2014 American League Wild Card Playoff, Pérez singled down the left field line in the bottom of the 12th inning, knocking in the winning run to lift the Royals over the Oakland As 9–8.

In Game 1 of the 2014 World Series against the San Francisco Giants, Pérez hit a home run off eventual series MVP Madison Bumgarner, representing the only run given up by Bumgarner in five World Series appearances covering 36 innings. Pérez was the final out of the series, popping out to Pablo Sandoval in foul territory to clinch the series for the Giants.

2015
In 2015, Pérez was voted to start in the 2015 All-Star Game, his third All-Star appearance.

Pérez batted .364 in the 2015 World Series, which the Royals won in five games. In the Series-clinching win, Pérez grounded to third in the ninth inning allowing the tying run in the Royals' comeback. The game continued into extra innings. In the 12th, Pérez singled to right with no outs and Jarrod Dyson pinch ran for Pérez. Dyson would eventually score, giving the Royals their first lead of the night. The Royals won 7–2 in the twelfth inning, making them the 2015 World Series Champions. Pérez was unanimously named the World Series Most Valuable Player. He is the first catcher to win the award since 1992 and the second Venezuelan to win World Series MVP.

In the 2015 season he played in 142 games while batting .260/.280/.426 with 21 home runs and 71 runs batted in. He also won his third consecutive Gold Glove Award.

2016
On March 1, Pérez signed a five-year extension to remain with the team through the 2021 season. Perez was named to his fifth consecutive All-Star Game as the starting catcher for the American League along with teammate Eric Hosmer. Pérez would finish the 2016 season batting .247/.288/.438, hitting 22 home runs (more than any other American League catcher) and driving in 64 runs en route to his first career Silver Slugger award. He had the lowest number of pitches per plate appearance in the major leagues (3.43). He won his fourth consecutive Gold Glove Award on November 8.

2017
Pérez hit his first career grand slam on June 21, 2017, helping the Royals to a 6-4 come from behind win against the Boston Red Sox. On August 6, Perez was placed on the 10-day disabled list due to an intercostal strain. He played 139 games in 2017, batting .268/.297/.495 with 27 home runs and 80 RBI.

2018
On March 28, 2018, Pérez suffered a grade 2 tear of the medial collateral ligament in his left knee while carrying a suitcase up a flight of stairs. It was deemed to be a non-baseball injury, and Perez was ruled out for 4–6 weeks. Perez returned to baseball activities with a minor league rehabilitation assignment with the Northwest Arkansas Naturals and Omaha Storm Chasers on April 15, and returned to the Royals' lineup on April 24 versus the Milwaukee Brewers. On May 10, celebrating his 28th birthday, Pérez  hit a grand slam, but the Royals lost to the Orioles 11–6.

Batting .213 with 11 home runs and 34 RBIs, Pérez was named to the 2018 MLB All-Star Game. On September 14, Perez hit his second grand slam of the season in the bottom of the ninth inning against the Minnesota Twins, breaking a 4–4 tie.

He finished his 2018 campaign batting .235/.274/.439 with 27 home runs and 80 RBIs. He swung at 48.4% of pitches outside the strike zone (the highest percentage in the majors). He also won his fifth Gold Glove, and second Silver Slugger award.

2019
On February 27, Pérez sustained an injury to his elbow during a workout in Surprise, Arizona. On March 1, an MRI revealed that there was a partial tear of the UCL in his right elbow. On March 6, it was revealed that Perez had undergone Tommy John surgery and would miss the entire 2019 season.

2020
During the coronavirus pandemic-shortened 2020 season, Pérez played in 37 of 60 games. On August 21, Pérez was placed on the 10-day injured list after experiencing lingering eye problems. He was reinstated on September 11. In 2020, Pérez batted .333/.353/.633 with 11 home runs and 32 RBIs, winning his third Silver Slugger award.

2021
On March 21, 2021, Pérez agreed to a franchise-record four-year, $82 million contract extension with the Royals that will keep him in Kansas City through the 2025 season. Pérez will earn $18 million in 2022, $20 million in 2023 and 2024, and $22 million in the 2025 season. The contract includes a $13.5 million fifth-year club option for the 2026 season or a $2 million buyout. On April 21, 2021, Pérez hit a walk off single in the bottom of the ninth inning to beat the Tampa Bay Rays 9–8. On July 11, Pérez participated in the 2021 MLB Home Run Derby. On August 4, he hit his 27th home run of the season, tying his career high. On August 10, the 10-year anniversary of his Major League debut, he hit two home runs in a game against the New York Yankees to give him a new career high of 29 home runs in a season. On August 26 and 27, he hit grand slams on two consecutive nights in games against the Seattle Mariners. On August 29, he hit his 38th home run of the season, breaking Carlton Fisk's 1985 record for the most total home runs hit in a season by an American League player who was a primary catcher (played at least 75 percent of their games that season at catcher). He also homered in his fifth straight game, matching Mike Sweeney's franchise record set during the 2002 season. On September 20, he hit his 46th home run of the season against the Cleveland Indians, breaking Johnny Bench's 1970 record for the most total home runs hit in a season by a primary catcher, and moving him past Sweeney for second place on the all-time list for home runs as a Royal, with 198. On September 29, he tied Jorge Soler for the Royals team record for most home runs in a season, with 48.

Pérez finished the season batting .273/.316/.544 with 48 home runs and a league-leading 121 RBIs, winning his fourth Silver Slugger award. His 48 home runs tied with Vladimir Guerrero, Jr. of the Toronto Blue Jays for the most in MLB, giving Pérez two-thirds of the batting Triple Crown. He swung at a higher percentage of pitches outside the strike zone than any other major leaguer, at 48.3%, and a higher percentage of all pitches, at 58.9%.

2022

On May 17, 2022, Pérez sprained his left thumb and was ruled out for ten days. On June 24, 2022, Pérez had surgery on the ulnar collateral ligament in his left thumb after aggravating the previous injury in a game versus the Los Angeles Angels on June 21. He was initially ruled out for at least eight weeks, but Royals team staff hoped he could return during the 2022 season. On July 29, 2022, Pérez returned to the Royals' lineup versus the New York Yankees.

Personal life

In the offseason, Pérez resides in his hometown with his wife, Maria Gabriela, sons Salvador, Jr., and Johan, and daughter, Paulina. On January 24, 2020, Pérez was naturalized as an American citizen, taking the oath of citizenship at the Royals' annual FanFest. On July 4, 2020, it was announced that Pérez had tested positive for COVID-19. On July 15, he returned to team activities.

In a game near the end of the 2013 season, teammate Alcides Escobar sprayed Pérez with Victoria's Secret women's perfume and told him he would get four hits, a prediction which came true; Pérez continued to wear perfume during games as a good-luck charm, switching to 212 VIP cologne by Carolina Herrera in 2014.

Pérez delights fans with his positive attitude and humorous postings on social media. In the 2014 and 2015 season, Pérez made a habit of playfully pestering teammate Lorenzo Cain by taking videos of him and posting them on Instagram. Pérez is also well known for giving a Gatorade shower ("Salvy Splash") to teammates during television interviews after every home win and notable away wins.

See also

 Kansas City Royals award winners and league leaders
 List of Kansas City Royals team records
 List of Major League Baseball career putouts as a catcher leaders
 List of Major League Baseball players from Venezuela

Notes

References

External links

Salvador Pérez at Pura Pelota (Venezuelan Professional Baseball League)

1990 births
Living people
American League All-Stars
American League home run champions
American League RBI champions
American sportspeople of Venezuelan descent
Arizona League Royals players
Burlington Bees players
Burlington Royals players
Gold Glove Award winners
Idaho Falls Chukars players
Kansas City Royals players
Luis Aparicio Award winners
Major League Baseball catchers
Major League Baseball players from Venezuela
Venezuelan expatriate baseball players in the United States
World Series Most Valuable Player Award winners
Northwest Arkansas Naturals players
Omaha Storm Chasers players
Silver Slugger Award winners
Sportspeople from Valencia, Venezuela
Surprise Rafters players
Tiburones de La Guaira players
Venezuelan emigrants to the United States
Wilmington Blue Rocks players
World Baseball Classic players of Venezuela
2013 World Baseball Classic players
2017 World Baseball Classic players
2023 World Baseball Classic players